Inaccessible Island may refer to:

Inaccessible Island, Tristan da Cunha, South Atlantic
Inaccessible Island (Dellbridge Islands), Antarctica
Inaccessible Islands, South Orkney Islands, South Atlantic
List of cities that are inaccessible by road